Apeejay Institute of Hospitality (AIH), CBD Belapur is an initiative of The Park Hotels and shares its premises with The Park, Navi Mumbai.  AIH offers degree programs in Hotel Management –B.Sc. in Hospitality Studies affiliated to University of Mumbai and B.Sc. in Hotel Management and catering operation affiliated to Yashwantrao Chavan Maharashtra Open University
All AIH B.Sc. students are conferred with six Professional Development certificates by The Park Hotels in the areas of Specialized Food and Beverage, E-Accommodations, Technology, General Management Skills and Contemporary Trends in the Hospitality Industry upon graduation. The Professional Development Programmes are conducted by the institute in association with The Park Hotels over 3 years.
Apeejay Institute of Hospitality (AIH) is a training center for The International Air Transport Association (IATA) and offers IATA Foundation in Travel & Tourism program. AIH is also the center of learning for  Apeejay Surrendra Park Hotels. The group's Management training Programme, Executive Training Programme, Professional Development programmes, as well as consultancy projects for  the hospitality industry are some of its  additional core activities.
AIH has a strong alumni network of students working with The Park Hotels, Taj Hotels Resorts and Palaces, Oberoi Hotels & Resorts (OCLD), ITC-HMI, The Leela Palace Chennai, Grand Hyatt Mumbai and Hyatt Regency, Sofitel BKC, ITC Maratha, ITC Grand Chola Hotel, McDonald's, Hotel Royal Tulip and more.

Awards

Apeejay Institute of Hospitality is a winner of "Best Learning & Development Center" at 4th GOLDEN STAR AWARDS 2011. Other winners in the category are Oberoi Centre for Learning and Development, The Taj Aurangabad and The Leela Academy. The "Golden Star Awards" acknowledge organisations for "Excellence in Food, Hospitality, Services & Food Retailing".

Governing Council

Apeejay Institute of Hospitality is established under the aegis of Apeejay Education Trust. The members of the governing council are
 Mrs. Shirin Paul, Chairperson Emeritus, Apeejay Surrendra Group
 Ms. Priya Paul, Chairperson, Apeejay Surrendra Park Hotels Ltd
 Mr. Vijay Dewan, Managing Director, Apeejay Surrendra Park Hotels Ltd
 Mr. Bhuvan.G.M, Principal, Apeejay Institute of Hospitality
 Dr. Harsha Mehta, Academician

References

External links 

Universities and colleges in Mumbai
2007 establishments in Maharashtra
Hospitality schools in India